Fourth Church of Christ, Scientist, located at 134 Polk Avenue in New Orleans, Louisiana,  is an historic structure that on July 19, 2002, was added to the National Register of Historic Places. Built in 1912, it was formerly the Lakeview Presbyterian Church. Like the rest of the Lakeview section of New Orleans, it was damaged in the levee failure disaster during Hurricane Katrina in 2005. It has been rebuilt.

National register listing
Fourth Church of Christ, Scientist (added 2002 - Building - #02000782)
Originally built as Lakeview Presbyterian Church
134 Polk Ave., New Orleans
Historic Significance: 	Architecture/Engineering
Architectural Style: 	Bungalow/Craftsman, Gothic Revival
Area of Significance: 	Architecture
Period of Significance: 	1925-1949
Owner: 	Private
Historic Function: 	Religion
Historic Sub-function: 	Religious Structure
Current Function: 	Religion
Current Sub-function: 	Religious Structure

See also
List of Registered Historic Places in Louisiana
Fourth Church of Christ, Scientist

References

External links

Pictures

Churches on the National Register of Historic Places in Louisiana
Gothic Revival church buildings in Louisiana
Christian Science churches in the United States
Churches in New Orleans
Churches completed in 1912
20th-century Christian Science church buildings
1912 establishments in Louisiana
National Register of Historic Places in New Orleans